Julie Heldman (born December 8, 1945) is an American tennis player who won 22 singles titles. In 1969 and 1974, she was ranked as the world No. 5. In 1968 and 1969, she was ranked No. 2 in the U.S. She was Canadian National 18 and Under Singles Champion at age 12, U.S. Champion in Girls’ 15 Singles and Girls’ 18 Singles, Italian Open Singles Champion, Canadian Singles and Doubles Champion, and U.S. Clay Court Doubles Champion. She won three medals at the 1968 Mexico City Olympics, and three gold medals at the 1969 Maccabiah Games.

In 2018, Heldman published a memoir, Driven, A Daughter's Odyssey. The book offers insights into the history of women's tennis in the mid-20th century, including an insider's account of the birth of the tour. Heldman reveals her struggles with the trauma of her mother's emotional abuse and with bipolar disorder.

Early life
Heldman was born in Berkeley, California, the daughter of Julius and Gladys Heldman. Julius was the 1936 USA National Junior Champion. He was a scientist and a leading amateur player, and Gladys Heldman was the founder, editor, and publisher of World Tennis magazine and the founder of the women's pro tour in 1970. Heldman is Jewish. Her older sister, Carrie, was also a competitive tennis player.

Education
Heldman received her Bachelor of Arts from Stanford University in 1966, and her Juris Doctor from UCLA Law School in 1981, where she was a UCLA Law Review editor and was Law School Graduate of the Year, as well as UCLA Graduate Woman of the Year.

Early tennis career

Heldman started playing tennis when she was eight, and won her first national title (the Canadian 18 and under singles) at age 12, in 1957. She won the US National Girls 15 & under singles title in 1960 and the US National Girls 18 and under title in 1963.

While a student at Stanford University in 1964, Heldman reached the national collegiate singles and doubles finals.

In 1965, Heldman reached the Italian championships semi-finals, won the Canadian National women's singles title, and was the finalist in the US National Clay Courts.

Olympics

In 1968, Heldman won a gold, a silver, and a bronze medal at the Mexico City Olympic Games when tennis was a demonstration sport Also in 1968, she won the South American mixed doubles with partner Herb Fitzgibbon.

Later tennis career

In early 1969, Heldman had two wins over world number one Margaret Court, one win over U.S. Number One Nancy Richey, and two wins over the 1968 U.S. Open champion Virginia Wade.

Heldman's most important title was the Italian Open, where she beat Ann Jones in the semis and Kerry Melville in the final.

During her career, Heldman reached the semifinals of three Grand Slam singles championships: the 1970 French Open, the 1974 Australian Open, and the 1974 US Open.

She also won doubles title at the US Women's Clay Court Championships and at the Canadian Open in 1974.

She was one of the Original 9, which was a group of female tennis players who joined the Virginia Slims Circuit, even with the risk of suspension for doing so. The Virginia Slims Circuit eventually led to the creation of the WTA Tour.

Women's pro tour

In 1970, Heldman's mother, Gladys, established the women's pro tour at the suggestion of Larry King and the sponsorship of Joe Cullman and Virginia Slims. She ran the tour for its first three years. Julie Heldman was one of the Original 9 players who competed in the Houston event, and she played on the tour until she retired in 1975.

Federation Cup

Heldman played on the US Federation Cup teams that captured the world team championship in 1966 and 1969.  She also played on the U.S. Federation Cup teams in 1970, 1974, and 1975.  She was the captain of the team in 1975.  Her career win–loss record in Federation Cup competition was 21–9.

Maccabiah Games

Heldman won three gold medals at the 1969 Maccabiah Games in Israel, in singles, doubles (partnering Marilyn Aschner), and mixed doubles.

Other career highlights
 Ranked in the USTA Top 10, 1963–65, 1968–69, 1971–75
 Ranked in the World Top 10, 1969–70, 1973–74
 Virginia Slims Professional Tour, 1971–75
 U.S. Wightman Cup Team Member, 1969–71, 1974; Most Valuable Player, 1969; Team Captain, 1974–75
 U.S. Bonne Bell Cup Team Member, 1973–1974; Most Valuable Player, Team Captain, 1974
 Winner of USTA Service Bowl 1975

Halls of Fame
Heldman was inducted into the:
Stanford Athletics Hall of Fame, 1978
National Jewish Sports Hall of Fame, 1989
ITA Women's Hall of Fame, 1998
International Jewish Sports Hall of Fame, 2001
USTA Eastern Tennis Hall of Fame, 2006

Personal life
After Heldman ended her playing career, she worked as a television color commentator and journalist, with CBS, NBC, PBS, and HBO at the US Open and Wimbledon, 1973–1978. She published articles about tennis in various magazines, including World Tennis and Seventeen. She was the first woman to cover a men's tennis event (the 1976 Avis Challenge Cup).

In 1981, Heldman married Bernie Weiss, and their daughter Amy was born in 1987. In 1985, Heldman became president and co-chair of Signature Eyewear. Heldman retired in 2000 because she suffered a breakdown that lasted nearly 15 years.

Memoir
Heldman's memoir Driven, A Daughter's Odyssey was published in August 2018. She writes “the book became a mainstay of my existence. It has profoundly contributed to my well being.” The book has been praised by former players and critics alike. Tennis historian Steve Flink called it "mandatory reading." Chris Evert called it a "must read."

Portrayal in film
Bridey Elliott plays Heldman in the 2017 movie Battle of the Sexes.

WTA Tour finals

Singles 1

Doubles 2 (1–1)

See also
List of select Jewish tennis players

References

External links

 
 
 
ITA bio
Jewish Sports Hall of Fame bio (2000)
 

1945 births
Living people
American female tennis players
Jewish American sportspeople
Jewish tennis players
Maccabiah Games gold medalists for the United States
Sportspeople from Berkeley, California
Stanford Cardinal women's tennis players
Tennis commentators
Tennis people from California
Maccabiah Games medalists in tennis
Competitors at the 1969 Maccabiah Games
Tennis players at the 1968 Summer Olympics
21st-century American Jews
21st-century American women